Danny Joe is a former Canadian politician. He represented the electoral district of Tatchun from 1987 to 1992, and Mayo-Tatchun from 1992 to 1996, in the Yukon Legislative Assembly.

A member of the Yukon New Democratic Party, Joe was formerly a Chief of the Selkirk First Nation. He first won the riding in a by-election in 1987, following the resignation of Roger Coles, and was reelected in the 1989 election. He was subsequently re-elected in the redistricted Mayo-Tatchun in the 1992 election. He did not run again in 1996 and was replaced by Eric Fairclough who also won the riding for the NDP.

References

1929 births
20th-century Canadian politicians
20th-century First Nations people
First Nations politicians
Indigenous leaders in Yukon
Living people
Tutchone people
Yukon New Democratic Party MLAs